Symington railway station served the village of Symington in Scotland between 1848 and 1965. It was on the main line of the Caledonian Railway and for most of its life was the junction for the branch to Peebles.

History
The station at Symington also opened on 15 February 1848. There were two platforms, a goods shed and some sidings; the station building was on the western (northbound) platform.

In the meantime, on 30 November 1863, Symington station was re-sited at the junction, which was to the north of the original site. The new station had three platforms and a turntable.

In 1904 the station was able to handle all classes of traffic (goods, passengers, parcels, wheeled vehicles, livestock, etc.) and there was a goods crane capable of lifting .

Decline and closure
The Peebles line closed on 5 June 1950. Symington station was listed for closure in the first Beeching report, and duly closed on 4 January 1965.

The remaining infrastructure at Symington consists of two crossovers  from Carlisle.

Notes

References

External links
Symington Station on navigable 1946 O.S. map
Photographs of Symington at Railscot

Disused railway stations in South Lanarkshire
Former Caledonian Railway stations
Railway stations in Great Britain opened in 1848
Railway stations in Great Britain closed in 1863
Railway stations in Great Britain opened in 1863
Railway stations in Great Britain closed in 1965
1848 establishments in England
1965 disestablishments in England
Beeching closures in Scotland